"Hit by Love" is a song by American singer CeCe Peniston, released as the fourth single from her second album, Thought 'Ya Knew (1994), in July 1994. It was her fifth number-one hit on the US Billboard Dance Club Play chart. Issued in Europe with "I'm Not Over You" on B-side, it peaked at number 33 on the UK Singles Chart and number 90 on the Billboard Hot 100 chart.

Critical reception
Jose F. Promis from AllMusic noted that "Hit by Love" "was closer in spirit to her early dance hits, but by that time the steam had worn off and the song didn't become a hit." Larry Flick from Billboard declared it "her best single" since "Finally". He added, "Surrounded by jumpy pop/house beats and sweet, disco-leaning synths, she has a field day with the song's giddy romantic tone and instantly memorable chorus. Will shine a warm, refreshing light on any station it graces, while loyal club fans will bathe in hard-hitting remixes by Junior Vasquez and David Morales." Annette M. Lai from the Gavin Report picked the "pop-infused" song as one of the "outstanding tracks" of the Thought 'Ya Knew album, adding it as "the track I listen to over and over". Tim Jeffery from Music Weeks RM Dance Update opined that it "is not as catchy as previous Peniston hits". A reviewer from People Magazine described it as "jumping".

Track listings and formats

 Mini-CD, Japan, #PODM-1041 "Hit by Love" (LP Version) - 4:36
 "Hit by Love" (Classic Radio Mix) - 3:52

 CD, Netherlands, #580 758-2 "Hit by Love" (Radio Mix) - 3:25
 "I'm Not Over You" (Hip Hop Mix) - 4:35

 Cassette, UK, #580 692-4 "Hit by Love" (Radio Mix) - 3:25
 "I'm Not Over You" (Hip Hop Mix) - 4:35
 "Through Those Doors" (Alternative Mix) - 4:35

 12-inch, Europe, #580 693-1 12-inch, UK, #AMY 693 "Hit by Love" (Def Classic Mix) - 8:16
 "Hit by Love" (LP Version) - 4:36
 "Hit by Love" (Classic Dub) - 5:40
 "Hit by Love" (Def Dub) - 7:25

 Cassette, US, #31458 0768 4 "Hit by Love" (LP Version) - 4:36
 "Hit by Love" (Classic Radio Mix) - 3:52
 "Hit by Love" (Alternate Radio Mix) - 4:30
 "Hit by Love" (Down Tempo Swing Mix) - 4:01

 Maxi-CD, Europe, #580 759-2 "Hit by Love" (Radio Mix) - 3:25
 "Hit by Love" (Classic Radio Mix) - 3:52
 "Hit by Love" (Def Classic Mix) - 8:16
 "Hit by Love" (The Body) - 6:55

 Maxi-CD, US, #31458 0769 2 "Hit by Love" (Classic Radio Mix) - 3:52
 "Hit by Love" (Alternate 7" Mix) - 4:33
 "Hit by Love" (D-Max Dub) - 6:45
 "Hit by Love" (LP Edit) - 4:10
 "Keep Givin' Me Your Love" (West End Remix) - 5:56

 12-inch, US, #31458 0765 1 "Hit by Love" (Alternate 12" Mix) - 7:40
 "Hit by Love" (D-Max Dub) - 6:45
 "Hit by Love" (Classic Dub) - 5:40
 "Hit by Love" (Def Classic Mix) - 8:16
 "Hit by Love" (Def Dub) - 7:25
 "Hit by Love" (LP Version) - 4:36

 Maxi-CD, UK, #AMCD 693 CD, UK, #580 693-2 "Hit by Love" (Radio Mix) - 3:25
 "Hit by Love" (Classic Radio Mix) - 3:52
 "Hit by Love" (Def Classic Mix) - 8:16
 "Hit by Love" (The Body) - 6:55
 "Hit by Love" (Def Dub) - 7:25
 "Hit by Love" (Classic Dub) - 5:40

 12-inch double A-side, Europe, #580 723-1 12-inch double A-side, UK, #AMY 723/580 723-1'
 "Hit by Love" (The Body) - 6:55
 "I'm Not Over You" (Jamie's Under The Swing Mix) - 6:56
 "I'm Not Over You" (Junior's Factory Mix) - 9:30

Credits and personnel
 CeCe Peniston – lead/back vocal, executive producer
 Steven Nikolas – writer, vocal arrangement
 Brendon Sibley – writer, vocal arrangement
 Carsten Schack – writer, producer, mix
 Kenneth Karlin – writer, producer, mix
 Cutfather – writer
 David Morales – remix, additional producer
 Mads Nilson – mix
 Doug Michael – engineer
 David Sussman – engineer
 Manny Lehman – executive producer
 Damon Jones – executive producer
 David Collins – mastering
 Patricia Sullivan – mastering
 Studio 56 – studio
 Medley Studio, Copenhagen – mix
 A&M Mastering Studios – mastering
 Steven and Brendon Songs/Casadida Publishing (ASCAP) – publisher
 EMI Virgin Music – admin, publisher

Charts

Weekly charts

Year-end charts

See also
 List of number-one dance singles of 1994 (U.S.)

References

External links
 

1994 singles
1994 songs
1997 singles
A&M Records singles
CeCe Peniston songs
Song recordings produced by Soulshock and Karlin
Songs written by Cutfather
Songs written by Kenneth Karlin
Songs written by Soulshock